James Rudolph Smithen (born 1942) is the current Dean of Antigua.

Smithen was educated at Queen's Theological College and  ordained in 1973.  After a curacy at  St. John's Cathedral Antigua he was Rector of Anguilla before returning to incumbencies in Antigua. He was Chaplain to the Bishop of Antigua from 1980.

References

Queen's University at Kingston alumni
Deans of Antigua
1942 births
Living people